Teletigre, also known as TV-9 TeleBogotá, is Colombia's first private television channel, founded by journalist and politician Consuelo Salgar de Montejo, who won a state bid against Caracol TV, RTI Colombia, and Producciones Punch. It is now operating as a Digital Channel through Youtube and is owned by "La Casa Editorial el Bogotano."

Its signal only reached Bogotá, Cundinamarca, Tolima, and part of Huila, and broadcast daily, from 17:30 to 22:30, on Channel 9, hence its alternative name.

The channel partnered with U.S. network ABC (which owned 50% of the stocks) and relied on imported programming. According to a newspaper ad published on its inaugural day, Teletigre's first week of programming included mostly American shows as I Love Lucy, The Munsters, Flipper, Gunsmoke, 77 Sunset Strip, Route 66, M Squad, Hong Kong, and The Twilight Zone, with a few local shows, such as a kids' show, a women's programme and a newscast, comprising the rest of the programming.

Teletigre closed for political reasons (allegedly to the fact that the government was concerned of the power that it had handed to one individual, in this case Ms Salgar, in the then new mass media). Therefore the government decided not to renew the station broadcast licence to a single party. It would be replaced by Tele 9 Corazón, a local channel in state hands and, in 1972, by the Segunda Cadena, which would become a national network.

Colombia would not have broadcast private television channels until July 1998, when Caracol TV and RCN TV, two former programadoras owned by two of the main Colombian conglomerates, started full broadcasts after being granted two new private national concessions the year before; as of 2020, they remain the only national broadcast TV private licensees.

References

External links
El Tiempo, Fechas que marcaron la historia de la televisión en Colombia, 10 June 2004

Defunct television channels
Television channels and stations established in 1966
Television channels and stations disestablished in 1971
Television stations in Colombia
Spanish-language television stations